Otto Perry (1894–1970) was an American photographer and railfan specializing in railroad photos. Perry worked as a mailman in Denver, Colorado, where he met and became friends with Louis McClure, another noted photographer.

By the time Perry died, his collection contained more than 20,000 photos, from all parts of North America. They were donated to the Western History Department of the Denver Public Library and have been made available for viewing on the internet.

See also
:Category:Otto Perry images

References

Further reading
 Otto Perry: Master Railroad Photographer (Otto Perry) Colorado Railroad Museum (1982) 
Catalogue of the Otto C. Perry Memorial Collection of Railroad Photographs (in two volumes), Western History Dept., Denver Public Library, 1977–80.

External links
Otto C. Perry memorial collection of railroad photographs at the Denver Public Library

 by Otto Perry
 

1894 births
1970 deaths
20th-century American photographers
Rail transport photographers